Flat Tops may refer to:

Flat Tops, a summit in Imperial County, California, United States
The Flat Tops (Utah), a summit in Emery County, Utah, United States
Flat Tops (Colorado), a mountain range in Garfield, Routt, and Rio Blanco Counties, Colorado, United States
The Flattops (Arizona), a summit in Apache County, Arizona, United States 
Flattops (Montana), a range in Carter County, Montana, United States 
A slang term for U.S. Navy aircraft carriers

See also
Flat Tops Wilderness